Reverend Jim Whittington (born February 16, 1941 in Dillon, South Carolina) is an American televangelist ordained minister, preacher missionary and faith healer. Whittington has been in the ministry for 51 years. His father, Rev. A.B. Whittington, pastored and ministered in the Pentecostal denomination for more than 50 years. Rev. Jim Whittington's uncle, Rev. H.L. Whittington of Atlanta, Georgia, was also a minister who built more than thirty churches, and also lived to be 104 years old.

Ministry

Whittington's ministry is now aimed at Jamaica and the Caribbean area. His organization, World Deliverance International, donated three containers of chicken to the children and needy families in December 2011. There was 160,000 cans of chicken distributed throughout the island. On June 12, 2012, another shipment of food was delivered to the island of Jamaica, with 270,000 meals on it. 50,000 of these meals are designated for Maxfield Children's Home, in Kingston, Jamaica, the oldest and largest orphanage in the island. In the past, Rev. Whittington has been active in bringing in US$1,000,000 worth of textbooks. These textbooks were given to Penwood High School and two other schools in Kingston.

References

American television evangelists
People from Dillon, South Carolina
Living people
1941 births